Alexis Francisco Peña López (born 13 January 1996) is a Mexican professional footballer who plays as a centre-back for Liga MX club Necaxa.

Honours
Cruz Azul
Liga MX: Guardianes 2021
Campeón de Campeones: 2021

References

External links
 
 
 Alexis Peña at WhoScored
 

1996 births
Living people
Mexican footballers
C.F. Pachuca players
Club Necaxa footballers
C.D. Guadalajara footballers
Cruz Azul footballers
Liga MX players
Liga Premier de México players
Tercera División de México players
Association football defenders
Footballers from Sinaloa
People from Culiacán